Charles Victor Pasqua (18 April 192729 June 2015) was a French businessman and Gaullist politician. He was Interior Minister from 1986 to 1988, under Jacques Chirac's cohabitation government, and also from 1993 to 1995, under the government of Edouard Balladur.

Early life and family background
Pasqua was born on 18 April 1927 in Grasse, Alpes-Maritimes. His paternal grandfather was a shepherd from Casevecchie, Corsica and he could speak Corsican fluently. As of 1987, his cousin served as the Mayor of Casevecchie.

During World War II, Pasqua joined the French Resistance at the age of sixteen.

Pasqua received his Baccalauréat, followed by a degree in Law.

Business career
From 1952 to 1971 Pasqua worked for Ricard, a producer of alcoholic beverages (most notably pastis), starting as a salesman.

In 1971, he founded Euralim, also known as Europe-Alimentation, an importer of Americano, a cocktail made by the Italian company Gancia.

Politics
In 1947, Pasqua helped create the section of the Gaullist Party RPF movement for the Alpes-Maritimes. With Jacques Foccart and Achille Peretti, he was the co-founder of the Service d'Action Civique (SAC) in 1959 to counter the terrorist actions of the OAS during the Algerian War of Independence (1954–1962). The SAC would be charged with the underground actions of the Gaullist movement and participated in the organization of the 30 May 1968 Gaullist counter-demonstration.

From 1968 to 1973, Pasqua was deputy to the French National Assembly for the Hauts-de-Seine département for the UDR party, of which he was a leading member from 1974 to 1976. He helped Jacques Chirac to take the lead of the party and participated in its transformation into the Rally for the Republic (RPR). Counsellor of Jacques Chirac alongside Marie-France Garaud, he was in charge of the organisation of Chirac's campaign for the 1981 presidential election, won by the candidate of the Socialist Party (PS), François Mitterrand (1981–1995). As such, he is considered to be Chirac's mentor in politics.

From 1981 to 1986 Pasqua was senator for the Hauts-de-Seine, then president of the RPR group in the Senate. From 1986 to 1988 he was Interior Minister (in charge of law enforcement). In 1992, he called a vote against the ratification of the Maastricht Treaty. He became Interior Minister again from 1993 to 1995, and supported the candidacy of Edouard Balladur at the 1995 presidential election. He is mostly remembered for having pushed a series of anti-immigration laws (lois Pasqua), and for his declaration "we will terrorize the terrorists."

Pasqua headed the Rally for France (RPF), a sovereigntist (Eurosceptic) party, for a while in association with Philippe de Villiers. At the 1999 European Parliament election, their list got ahead of the RPR list. He served as the President of the General Council of the Hauts-de-Seine from 1988 to 2004. In 2004, he was elected senator by an electoral college.

In 2008, Pasqua was convicted of illegal lobbying in the Mitterrand–Pasqua affair during his time serving as French Interior Minister. He was sentenced to a one-year jail term.

In 2005, a US Senate report accused him, along with the British Respect politician George Galloway, of receiving the right to buy oil under the UN's oil-for-food scheme. Pasqua denied the charges and pointed out that he never met Saddam Hussein, had never been to Iraq, and never cultivated any political ties with that country. In a lengthy written rebuttal to the Senate report, Charles Pasqua pointed out further that since the oil vouchers were lifted by a legal entity incorporated in a European country, it should be relatively easy for investigators to uncover the masterminds behind the fraud instead of making accusations based on "sensational" press articles.

Personal life and death
Pasqua was married to Jeanne Joly, from Quebec, Canada. They had a son, Pierre-Philippe Pasqua, who predeceased him, dying in February 2015.

He died of a heart attack on 29 June 2015 at the Foch Hospital in Suresnes, near Paris.

References

1927 births
2015 deaths
People from Grasse
French people of Corsican descent
Politicians from Provence-Alpes-Côte d'Azur
Rally of the French People politicians
Union for the New Republic politicians
Union of Democrats for the Republic politicians
Rally for the Republic politicians
French interior ministers
Deputies of the 4th National Assembly of the French Fifth Republic
French Senators of the Fifth Republic
Senators of Hauts-de-Seine
Presidents of the General Council of Hauts-de-Seine
Rally for France MEPs
MEPs for France 1999–2004
Mitterrand–Pasqua affair
French politicians convicted of crimes
French Resistance members